Coleman Lake is an unincorporated community in Emanuel County, in the U.S. state of Georgia.

History
The Georgia General Assembly incorporated the place in 1953 as the "Town of Coleman's Lake". The town's municipal charter was dissolved in 1995.

References
The name Coleman Lake does not have a S in it. Ref; my grandfather Oscar Fulghum who bought it in 1921.

Former municipalities in Georgia (U.S. state)
Unincorporated communities in Emanuel County, Georgia
Populated places disestablished in 1995